is a 1969 Japanese yakuza film directed by Akinori Matsuo.

Plot
The brothers of Tetsujirō and Tetsugorō, who lost their parents and home after the Great Kanto Earthquake, were picked up and grew up by a Yakuza Goi clan. One day, Tetsugorō fights the confronted yakuza Honma clan, and is expelled from Goi clan's Boss. Later, boss Goi is attacked by Honma clan's assassin and seriously injured. The assassin is Tetsutaōr, Tetsugorō's eldest brother, who had been missing after the Great Kanto Earthquake.

Cast
 Hideki Takahashi as Nonaka Tetsugorō
 Shigeru Tsuyuguchi as Nonaka Tetsujirō
 Yumiko Nogawa as Ochō
 Yoshirō Aoki as Nonaka Tetsutarō
 Ryōhei Uchida as Obuse Keita
 Hei Enoki as Tamura Gunji
 Shouki Fukae as Honma Ginzō
 Tomiko Ishii as Shibata Chiyo
 Yoko Machida as Nonaka Shima
 Ichirō Sugai as Goi Kiichirō
 Toru Abe as Omori Giichirō

References

External links
 

Nikkatsu films
Yakuza films
Japanese crime films
1960s Japanese-language films
1970s Japanese films
1960s Japanese films